Douglas Gonzaga Leite (born March 27, 1980), sometimes known as just Douglas, is a Brazilian football player who currently plays from Guarani in the Série A2 as a goalkeeper.

Career
Douglas Leite came to football at St. Joseph Sports Club. It went through several clubs in Brazil and abroad, and hit his engagement with the Avaí on May 11, 2008, where he was reserve goalkeeper Eduardo Martini's campaign team in the Campeonato Brasileiro Serie B 2008 culminating in the achievement of access the series A. Later, Douglas Leite was hired by Mirassol to compete in the Paulista championship in 2009, but did not even play for the club is moving straight to the Guarani to fight for the championship.

In July 2013 Leite signed for Azerbaijan Premier League side Khazar Lankaran. On 25 November 2013 it was announced that Douglas would leave Khazar Lankaran to re-sign with Guarani for the 2014 Série A2 season.

Career statistics
(Correct )

Honours
 Coritiba
Campeonato Paranaense: 2003, 2004
 Khazar Lankaran
 Azerbaijan Supercup: 2013

Contract
 Naútico
 Red Bull Brasil

References

External links
ogol 

1980 births
Living people
Brazilian footballers
Guarani FC players
Clube Náutico Capibaribe players
Criciúma Esporte Clube players
Association football goalkeepers